Islam Mansouri (born 23 July 1997) is an Algerian cyclist, who currently rides for Mouloudia Club d'Alger. His brother Hamza is also a professional road cyclist.

Major results

2014
 Arab Junior Road Championships
1st  Time trial
1st  Team time trial
 National Junior Road Championships
1st  Road race
2nd Time trial
2015
 1st  Road race, National Junior Road Championships
 African Junior Road Championships
2nd  Road race
2nd  Time trial
 3rd  Time trial, Arab Junior Road Championships
2016
 9th Critérium International de Sétif
2017
 1st  Team time trial, Arab Road Championships (with Abderrahmane Mansouri, Azzedine Lagab & Abdellah Ben Youcef)
 National Under-23 Road Championships
1st  Time trial
5th Road race
 1st Overall Tour du Sénégal
1st Young rider classification
1st Stage 2
 1st Stage 1 Tour d'Algérie
 1st Stage 5 Tour de Tunisie
 1st Stage 3 Grand Prix International de la ville d'Alger
 7th Road race, African Road Championships
2018
 1st Stage 8 Tour du Sénégal
 3rd  Team time trial, African Road Championships
 4th Road race, National Road Championships
2019
 2nd Time trial, National Under-23 Road Championships
 3rd  Time trial, African Under-23 Road Championships
 8th Overall Tour d'Egypte
1st Young rider classification

References

1997 births
Living people
Algerian male cyclists
Competitors at the 2018 Mediterranean Games
Mediterranean Games competitors for Algeria
21st-century Algerian people
Competitors at the 2022 Mediterranean Games
20th-century Algerian people